CITG may refer to:

 Triphosphoribosyl-dephospho-CoA synthase, an enzyme
 Chartered Institute of Taxation, Ghana